Osijek railway station is the principal railway station in Osijek and one of the larger stations in Croatia. It is located on Lavoslav Ružička Square in the centre of Osijek.

References 

Buildings and structures in Osijek
Railway stations in Croatia